Mischa  Cotlar (1913, Sarny, Russian Empire – January 16, 2007, Buenos Aires, Argentina) was a mathematician who started his scientific career in Uruguay and worked most of his life on it in Argentina and Venezuela.

His contributions to mathematics are in the fields of harmonic analysis, ergodic theory and spectral theory.  He introduced the Cotlar–Stein lemma. He was the author or co-author of over 80 articles in refereed journals.

According to Alberto Calderón, Cotlar showed in 1955 "that theorems on singular integrals can be generalized and put in the framework of ergodic theory." According to Krause, Lacey, and Wierdl, Karl E. Petersen in 1983 published an "especially direct proof" of Cotlar's 1955 theorem.

In January 1994 in Caracas, an international conference was held in his honor.

Selected publications
 Aritmética abstracta, Boletín de la Facultad de Ingeniería, Montevideo, Uruguay, 1937
 Teoría de anágenos, An. Soc. Ci. Argentina, 127, 1939
 Familias normales de funciones no analíticas, An. Soc. Ci. Argentina 129, 1940
 Un método para obtener congruencias de números de Bernoulli, Math. Notae 7, 1947
 On The Foundation Of The Ergodic Theory, Actas Symposia, UNESCO, 1951
 
 with R. Ricabarra: 
 A combinatorial inequality and its application to L2 spaces, Math. Cuyana, 1, 1955
 
 with R. Panzone: 
 Convolution Operators and Factorization, McGill Analysis Seminar, McGill University, Montreal, 1972
 
  
 with C. Sadosky: 
 with Pedro Alegría:

References

External links

 Analysis Center, Faculty of Sciences, Central University of Venezuela
 Mischa Cotlar: A Biography
  (section on Mischa Cotlar from 51:04 to 57:57)

Argentine mathematicians
Argentine Jews
2007 deaths
1913 births
Soviet emigrants to Uruguay